Roger Milford is a former football referee.

He took charge of the 1991 FA Cup Final. 

As of 2002, he was working for The FA as an assessor.

As of October 2014 he was listed as being the Senior Referee Coach at the Gloucestershire FA.

References

British football referees
FA Cup Final referees
Living people
Year of birth missing (living people)